Hannah Sian Topp (born 1990), known professionally as Aldous Harding, is a New Zealand folk singer-songwriter, based in Lyttelton, New Zealand.

Biography
Harding comes from a musical family in Lyttelton, New Zealand. Her mother is folk singer Lorina Harding. One of the first musicians who came across her was New Zealand folk-pop singer/songwriter Anika Moa. Moa asked Harding to play support for her that night after finding her busking outside the venue she was about to play.

She has released music through independent record labels Flying Nun, Spunk, and 4AD. She has collaborated with Marlon Williams, John Parish, Mike Hadreas (also known as Perfume Genius), and Fenne Lily.

4AD announced Harding as a new signing in early 2017 just prior to the release of her second album, Party. Party was nominated for IMPALA's European Album of the Year Award.

The song "The Barrel", from her third album Designer (Flying Nun, 4AD, 2019), won the 2019 APRA Silver Scroll award.

 she is based in Cardiff, Wales, where she had previously lived with partner and collaborator H. Hawkline.

Discography

Studio albums

Other charted songs

References

External links

Aldous Harding Subreddit
Aldous Harding Flying Nun Records page

1990 births
21st-century New Zealand women singers
4AD artists
Living people
New Zealand folk musicians
New Zealand singer-songwriters
People from Lyttelton, New Zealand